10–0 is the final score of the Süper Lig game played between Beşiktaş J.K. and Adana Demirspor at 1989–90 season, on 15 October  1989. The score sets the current Biggest win record in History of Süper Lig.

Match
Beşiktaş started 1989–90 season with 2 losses and 1 draw at first 5 games, before playing against Adana Demirspor. Game took place on 15 October  1989, Sunday at Ali Sami Yen Stadium.

Beşiktaş started the game without any foreign players. Ali Gültiken opened score with a header in 2nd minute. Feyyaz Uçar scored second goal at 12th minute. First half ended 4–0, following 2 goals scored by Metin Tekin respectively in 24th and 43rd minutes. Goals were scored Gültiken (4), Uçar (3) and Tekin (3).

Beşiktaş generated TL207.74m of revenue in consequence of 15,227 of attendance. The score led Beşiktaş supporters to compose particular chant, dedicated to this game.

Details

References

External links
 Highlights of the Game

Record association football wins
1989–90 in Turkish football
Süper Lig matches
1989
Adana Demirspor